is a retired Japanese athlete who competed in the long-distance events. She represented her country at the 2000 Summer Olympics, as well as three World Championships. She also took part in nine editions of World Cross Country Championships.

Competition record

Personal bests
3000 metres – 9:11.70 (Tokyo 1994)
5000 metres – 15:22.64 (Osaka 1999)
10,000 metres – 31:27.57 (Sendai 1998)
20 kilometres – 1:06:58 (Berlin 2002)
Half marathon – 1:11:18 (Sendai 2001)

References

1976 births
Living people
Sportspeople from Miyagi Prefecture
Japanese female long-distance runners
Japanese female cross country runners
Olympic athletes of Japan
Athletes (track and field) at the 2000 Summer Olympics
Asian Games bronze medalists for Japan
Asian Games medalists in athletics (track and field)
Athletes (track and field) at the 1998 Asian Games
Medalists at the 1998 Asian Games
World Athletics Championships athletes for Japan
Asian Cross Country Championships winners
20th-century Japanese women
21st-century Japanese women